Evelyn Richter (31 January 1930 – 10 October 2021) was a German art photographer known primarily for social documentary photography work in East Germany. She is notable for her black & white photography in which she documented working-class life, and which often showed influences of Dadaism and futurism. Her photography is focused on people in everyday life, including children, workers (especially women), artists and musicians.

She taught photography both at the Hochschule für Grafik und Buchkunst Leipzig, where she had studied, from 1981, as in the 1990s, at the Fachhochschule in Bielefeld. Her work became known internationally only after German reunification.

She received awards such as the Culture Award from the German Society for Photography, the Art Prize of Dresden, and the Bernd und Hilla Becher-Preis for her life's work.

Life and work
Richter was born in Bautzen in 1930.

After completing a photographic apprenticeship in Dresden with Franz Fiedler and Pan Walther from 1948 to 1951, Richter worked as a laboratory assistant at the Vereinigte Kaufstätten Dresden and as a photographer at the TU Dresden. In 1953, she enrolled at the Hochschule für Grafik und Buchkunst Leipzig (HGB) to study Fotografik (graphic photography) with Johannes Widmann, professor of the Institute of Photography. In 1955, she was removed as a student for her "independent interests and pictorial ideas which are foreign to the demands of a realistic socialist art."

Richter worked as a freelance photographer, working for such clients as the Leipzig Trade Fair and Sibylle magazine, while simultaneously building a body of work documenting life, work, and societal change in East Germany. Her photographs frequently explored the relationship between industrial machinery and the human (often female) operators. Her focus was portraits of people in everyday situations, such as children, artists, poets and musicians, and she waited patiently for the right moment. She followed the violinist David Oistrach, travelling to concerts and rehearsals, and made a photo book about him.

Richter taught photography at the HGB from 1981, as an honorary professor from 1991 to 2002. In the 1990s, she also taught at the Fachhochschule in Bielefeld.

The Evelyn Richter Archive, with over 730 of her photographs, has been housed at the Museum der bildenden Künste (Museum of Fine Arts) in Leipzig since 2009. An exhibition of her works was held in 2010 on the occasion of her 80th birthday at the Leonhardimuseum Dresden. In 2016, her photographies were exhibited in a group show, Gehaltene Zeit, together with works by Ursula Arnold and Arno Fischer, at the Museum der bildenden Künste, Leipzig. In 2020, she was the first recipient of the Bernd und Hilla Becher-Preis of Düsseldorf for her life's work. The jury noted: 

Richter died in Dresden at age 91 in a nursing home where she had lived for eight years after a stroke.

Publications

Publications by Richter
 Arrested Time = Stillgehaltene Zeit. Heidelberg: Braus, 2002. Edited by Astrid Ihle. . With a text by Matthias Flg̈ge. In German and English. Catalogue published "on the occasion of the Evelyn Richter exhibition in the Goethe Institute in Washington DC, from November 6, 2002 until January 10, 2003, and in the Leica Gallery in New York City from January 30, 2003 to March 1, 2003".

Publications with contributions by Richter
 Wer War Wer in der DDR? Berlin: Links, 2010. By Helmut Müller-Enbergs. .

Awards 
 1975: Ehrenpreis für Fotografie des Kulturbundes der DDR
 1978: Ehrenpreis of then photokina in Cologne
 1992: Kulturpreis der Deutschen Gesellschaft für Photographie of the German Photographic Society
 1997: Villa Massimo
 1992: Culture Award, German Society for Photography, Cologne
 2006: Kunstpreis der Landeshauptstadt Dresden (Art prize of the state capital of Dresden)
 2020: Bernd und Hilla Becher-Preis

Exhibitions

Solo exhibitions 
 2002/2003: Goethe-Institut, Washington, D.C., November 2002 – January 2003

Group exhibitions 
 2010: Eros und Stasi. Ostdeutsche Fotografie Sammlung Gabriele Koenig, Ludwig Forum für Internationale Kunst, Aachen.
 2012/2013: The Shuttered Society: Art Photography in the GDR 1949-1989, Berlinische Galerie, Berlin.
 2016: Gehaltene Zeit. Ursula Arnold, Arno Fischer, Evelyn Richter, Museum der bildenden Künste, Leipzig.
 2016: Die Lehre. Arno Fischer, Evelyn Richter, Art gallery of Sparkasse Leipzig. Common catalog.

Explanatory notes

References 

1930 births
2021 deaths
20th-century German women
20th-century women photographers
21st-century German photographers
21st-century German women
21st-century women photographers
East German photographers
East German women
German women photographers
Hochschule für Grafik und Buchkunst Leipzig alumni
People from Bautzen
Photographers from Saxony
Social documentary photographers
Women photojournalists